Live at the Boston Garden: April 5, 1968 is a concert film starring James Brown. Recorded at the Boston Garden by WGBH-TV the night after the assassination of Martin Luther King, Jr., it was broadcast live in an effort to quell potential riots in the city. The recording circulated as a bootleg before it was officially released on DVD by Shout! Factory in 2008 as part of the box set I Got the Feelin': James Brown in the '60s. It received a stand-alone release in 2009.

The concert was the subject of the 2008 PBS/VH-1 documentary The Night James Brown Saved Boston, directed by David Leaf and a chapter of Common Ground by J. Anthony Lukas.

Songs
 "That's Life"
 "Kansas City"
 Medley: "It's a Man's Man's Man's World"/"Lost Someone"/"Bewildered"
 "Get It Together"
 "There Was a Time"
 "I Got the Feelin'"
 "Try Me"
 Medley: "Cold Sweat"/"Ride the Pony"/"Cold Sweat"
 "I Got You (I Feel Good)"
 "Please, Please, Please"
 "I Can't Stand Myself (When You Touch Me)"

See also
List of American films of 1968
 James Brown: Man to Man

References

External links
James Brown 1968 concert in Boston – at History.com Archive
James Brown 1968 concert in Boston – at WGBH.org Archive
James Brown 1968 concert in Boston – at TheCurrent.org Archive
James Brown 1968 concert in Boston – at okayplayer.com Archive

James Brown
1968 films
1960s American television specials
Concert films
1968 in Massachusetts
1968 television specials
American television films
Boston Garden
1960s in Boston
1960s English-language films